Pterastheniinae is a small subfamily of the family Aphididae.

References

Aphididae
Hemiptera subfamilies